The casual subculture is a subsection of football culture that is typified by hooliganism and the wearing of expensive designer clothing (known as "clobber"). The subculture originated in the United Kingdom in the early 1980s when many hooligans started wearing designer clothing labels and expensive sportswear such as Stone Island, CP Company, Lacoste, Sergio Tacchini, Fila,  Hackett, ellesse, Napapijri, & Fred Perry in order to avoid the attention of police and to intimidate rivals. They did not wear club colours, so it was easier to infiltrate rival groups and to enter pubs. Some casuals have worn clothing items similar to those worn by mods. Casuals have been portrayed in films and television programmes such as ID, The Firm, The Football Factory, and Green Street. The documentary Casuals: The Story of the Legendary Terrace Fashion featuring Pat Nevin, Peter Hooton and Gary Bushell amongst others is about the fashion that started in the late 70s and into the 1980s.

History
The designer clothing and fashion aspect of the casual subculture began in the mid-to-late 1970s.  One well documented precursor was the trend of Liverpool youths starting to dress differently from  other football fans — in Peter Storm jackets, straight-leg jeans and Adidas trainers. Liverpool F.C. fans were the first British football fans to wear continental European fashions, which they picked up while following their teams at matches in Europe during their run of strong performance in the UEFA Cup and European Cup in the 1970s and 80s.

The other documented precursor, according to Colin Blaney, was a subculture known as Perry Boys, which originated in the mid-1970s as a precursor to the casuals. The Perry Boys subculture consisted of Manchester football hooligans styling their hair into a flick and wearing sportswear, Fred Perry shirts and Dunlop Green Flash trainers.

See also
 Chav
 Lad culture
 List of hooligan firms
 List of subcultures
 Prole drift
 Yobbo
 Ultras

References

Further reading

External links 
Casual Dress Essential article from The Guardian
 Emotional Hooligan: Post-Subcultural Research and the Histories of Britain's Football Gangs
Transforming the terraces article from Times Online (requires log-in)

Association football hooliganism
Youth culture in the United Kingdom
Fashion
Socioeconomic stereotypes